Myma Seldon (born 9 August 1979) is a British television and radio presenter and voiceover artist.

Background
Seldon was born Jemima Seldon on 9 August 1979 in Farnborough, London, England. She has a 2:1 English/Philosophy B.A. (Hons) from Leeds University. She also has a Postgraduate Diploma in Journalism from the London School of Journalism.

Career
Seldon began her career presenting the 7pm–10pm evening show for Liberty Radio, a London-based music and talk station. She then presented Liberty Radio's 11am-3pm weekday show before moving to Invicta FM, Capital Radio's biggest regional station.

After moving to KMFM, she presented the "Drivetime" show on the three western KMFM stations (KMFM Maidstone, KMFM Medway and KMFM West Kent), and was also the Regional Programme Controller (West) for the KMFM group. From July 2010 she presented "KMFM Daytimes" 10am-3pm weekdays and "Sunday Night Love" before leaving the network in 2012. Both shows were networked on all seven KMFM stations. She also provides voicetracked material for the Co-op's in-store radio station.

On television, Seldon has presented for ITV, CBBC, Eurosport and Challenge. She also presents on World of Motorsport on UK digital satellite stations Sky Sports 1, 2, 3 and Extra.

She appeared in the February 2002 issue of FHM in a feature on the UK's most attractive radio presenters, making the top six. Unbeknownst to her, a friend sent off a photo to the magazine. The first she knew of it was when she got a call saying she had made the top seven.

References

External links
Official web site
DJ page at KMFM
Radiotalent

British television presenters
British radio personalities
British sports broadcasters
1979 births
Living people